Lauren Diane Bennett (born 23 June 1989) is an English singer who is known for being a member of the girl group G.R.L. Bennett has also worked with the Paradiso Girls, CeeLo Green, Robin Antin, The Pussycat Dolls, and LMFAO. She was featured on the lattermost's 2011 track "Party Rock Anthem", which became her first number one single in the United Kingdom and United States.

Career

2007–2010: Paradiso Girls
Bennett was part of a girl group called the Paradiso Girls. The group consisted of seven members at their formation in 2007, but had dropped to five by 2008. Each member comes from a different country: Chelsea Korka from the United States, Aria Crescendo from France, Kelly Beckett from Barbados, Shar Mae Amor from the Philippines, and Bennett from England. The band was signed to Interscope Records. Their debut single, "Patron Tequila", featuring Lil Jon and Eve, was released on 12 May 2009 and reached No. 3 on the Hot Dance Club Play Chart and No. 82 on the Canadian Hot 100. After their second single, "Who's My Bitch", was unsuccessful, the group disbanded in 2010.

2010–2013: Solo career

Bennett went on to pursue a solo career. She was featured in a remix of will.i.am's "I Got It from My Mama". She also joined in the Party Rock Tour with LMFAO. Later that year, she met CeeLo Green and was featured on his album The Lady Killer on the song "Love Gun". The following year, she was featured on LMFAO's international hit "Party Rock Anthem", which sold over 5,000,000 digital downloads in the United States and reached No. 1 in the United States for six weeks, becoming Bennett's first number one single on the US Billboard Hot 100. Bennett often works with Robin Antin and is featured in the Pussycat Dolls' second fitness DVD. Her debut solo single "I Wish I Wish" was released on 21 November 2011 via Interscope Records. The track was written by Esmée Denters, Billy Mann and produced by David Schuler.

2013–15: G.R.L.
While talking to Billboard.com on the red carpet at the American Music Awards, Bennett confirmed herself as a part of the newly regrouped recording group. This made her the first member of a brand new line-up that creator Robin Antin confirmed to Billboard was in the process of being built. "We're currently figuring out who's in the group and we're working on an album", Bennett says of the new group, which at the time was slated to be the revamped Pussycat Dolls. In 2011 it was announced that a new line-up of the "sexy brand" would debut in February 2012 during a GoDaddy Super Bowl commercial. Bennett was featured and included in the original line-up along with Paula van Oppen and three others who were cut from the group for various reasons. Eventually, Simone Battle, Emmalyn Estrada, and Natasha Slayton joined and G.R.L. debuted their hit single "Vacation" on Smurfs 2 soundtrack.

G.R.L. found international success and was featured with artists such as Pitbull on his hit single "Wild Wild Love". The group went on to release a self-titled EP, G.R.L., in which its lead single Ugly Heart peaked at 2 on the Australian charts. G.R.L. were on their way to mainstream success when group member Simone Battle died in September 2014. In January 2015, the group released a single in honor of Battle titled "Lighthouse", and dedicated themselves to raising awareness for mental health issues. On 2 June 2015, the group officially disbanded.

2016: Continued solo career, Hurricane and G.R.L. reformation
On 8 April 2016, a dance track featuring Bennett and produced by Greek DJ Nick Martin titled "Reality" was released.

On 8 May 2016, Bennett announced and released her new single "Hurricane" via her Instagram, adding "After G.R.L. ended I had no idea what was going to happen next, everything fell apart pretty fast. That's when this song was written. After seeing my mother suffer with mental struggles for years I then lost a friend to this. It has always affected my life in some way. We all at least know someone who has dealt with it or have yourself. This is a story to show from my eyes what it feels like to suffer from this but also the other perspective to lose someone to this." It was later announced on Twitter that a portion of the proceeds from the single would be donated to The Campaign to Change Direction, an organization dedicated to change the culture of mental health in America.

On 15 June 2016, over a year after G.R.L. announced their breakup, it was reported that the group has plans to reform under new representation with UK based agency Loco Talent.
In June, the group's new agent, Matt Wynter, stated that the G.R.L. is back via Loco Talent's website. Bennett is one of the two original members returning under the new lineup. The group's lead single "Are We Good" was released on 9 December.

2017: BENNETT
In 2017 along with her brother Ryan, the siblings formed BENNETT, a folk, country, blues and rock duo. Their debut single "It's All Good" was released on 2 June 2017.

Discography

Singles

As main artist

As a featured artist

References

External links

1989 births
Living people
People from Meopham
English women pop singers
British contemporary R&B singers
English female dancers
English expatriates in the United States
Interscope Records artists
Musicians from Kent
21st-century English women singers
21st-century English singers
Paradiso Girls members
G.R.L. members